Albatros Airways Sh.p.k was a low-cost airline based in Tirana in Albania. It flew to destinations in Italy using Fokker 100 aircraft. Its main base was Rinas Mother Teresa Airport (TIA), Tirana. On 1 September 2006 the airline was grounded, only with one phone call on 31 August 2006, by the Albanian aviation authorities because of unpaid airport and air traffic control fees.

History 
The airline was established and started operations on 3 November 2004.

On September 1, 2006, the airline was grounded and according to local media it was advised to stop selling tickets. 
The grounding led to heavy political controversies in Albania. The opposition and the management accused the government of having interfered against Albatros Airways violating the free market economy. The office of the President of Albania was blamed of having favoured Albatros Airways.

Destinations 
These are the scheduled international destinations as of July 2006:

Domestic

Tirana (Rinas Mother Teresa Airport) Hub

International

Bari
Milan Orio al Serio
Pescara
Pisa
Rimini
Venice
Verona

Fleet 

As of August 2006 the Albatros Airways fleet includes:
1 Fokker 100 (leased from Montenegro Airlines).

See also 
 List of defunct airlines of Albania

References

External links

  via Wayback Machine

Defunct airlines of Albania
Defunct European low-cost airlines
Airlines established in 2004
Airlines disestablished in 2006
2004 establishments in Albania
2006 disestablishments in Albania